"Danger (Been So Long)" is the second single released by American rapper Mystikal from his fourth album, Let's Get Ready (2000), featuring singer Nivea. The song was released on December 12, 2000, and was produced by the Neptunes. "Danger" was a success commercially, peaking at number 14 on the US Billboard Hot 100, number one on the Hot R&B/Hip-Hop Singles & Tracks chart, and number three on the Hot Rap Singles chart. "Danger (Been So Long)" was the second single from the album to reach the top 20 on the US charts, after "Shake Ya Ass".

"Danger" was used as part of a running gag on The Daily Show during John Oliver's tenure as interim host in 2013, and again on Oliver's own show Last Week Tonight in 2016, in reference to Anthony Weiner's scandalous mayoral campaign and his online pseudonym, "Carlos Danger".

Track listings
US and UK 12-inch single
A1. "Danger (Been So Long)" (clean) – 3:35
A2. "Danger (Been So Long)" (instrumental) – 3:35
B1. "Danger (Been So Long)" (LP version) – 3:32
B2. "Danger (Been So Long)" ("Breathing" instrumental) – 3:35

UK and Australian CD single
 "Danger (Been So Long)" (clean) – 3:35
 "Danger (Been So Long)" (LP version) – 3:32
 "Danger (Been So Long)" ("Breathing" instrumental) – 3:35

European CD single
 "Danger (Been So Long)" (clean) – 3:35
 "Danger (Been So Long)" (LP version) – 3:32

Charts

Weekly charts

Year-end charts

Release history

References

2000 singles
2000 songs
Jive Records singles
Music videos directed by Director X
Mystikal songs
Nivea (singer) songs
Song recordings produced by the Neptunes
Songs written by Chad Hugo
Songs written by Mystikal
Songs written by Pharrell Williams